Ivan Viktorovich Leskov (born 11 December 1977) is a former Russian professional football player.

Club career
He played in the Russian Football National League for FC Chita in 2009.

References

External links
 

1977 births
Living people
Russian footballers
Association football defenders
FC Zvezda Irkutsk players
FC Baikal Irkutsk players
FC Chita players